The Court Jester is a 1955 musical-comedy, medieval romance, costume drama film starring Danny Kaye, Glynis Johns, Basil Rathbone, Angela Lansbury and Cecil Parker.

The movie was written, produced, and directed by Melvin Frank and Norman Panama for Paramount Pictures. It was released in Technicolor and the VistaVision widescreen format.

The film centers on Hubert Hawkins, a carnival entertainer working with the Black Fox's band of rebels (a parody of Robin Hood and his Merry Men) to guard the true infant King of Medieval England from a usurper. A strange chance causes Hawkins to become a spy in the guise of a court jester in the usurping King's castle, where there are many people who wish to make use of the Jester for their own villainous ends. The film contains three songs (all sung by Kaye), makes heavy use of slapstick comedy and quick-witted wordplay, and is best remembered for the tongue twister "The pellet with the poison's in the vessel with the pestle; the chalice from the palace has the brew that is true!"

Though the film was not financially successful upon release, it has grown to be a beloved classic, earning high scores on Rotten Tomatoes. In 2004, The Court Jester was included in the annual selection of 25 motion pictures added to the National Film Registry of the Library of Congress being deemed "culturally, historically, or aesthetically significant" and recommended for preservation.

Plot 

King Roderick the Tyrant, having sent Lord Ravenhurst to slaughter the Royal Family of England, usurps the throne. The Black Fox and his band of rebels rescue the true king, an infant with the royal "purple pimpernel" birthmark on his backside. They harass Roderick and his men while guarding the baby. Lords Brockhurst, Finsdale, and Pertwee convince the king to seek alliance with Sir Griswold of MacElwain, by offering him Roderick's daughter Gwendolyn in marriage. Gwendolyn objects, for the castle witch Griselda foretold a more gallant lover.

Hubert Hawkins, the Black Fox's minstrel, brings a troupe of acrobat-midgets from the carnival to replace him so he can fight, but the Black Fox refuses. The King's men find their hideout, so Hawkins and another rebel, Maid Jean, are ordered to disguise themselves as wine merchants and take the baby to safety. They meet the king's newly hired jester, Giacomo, on the road. Jean knocks him out and tells Hawkins to steal his identity. Hawkins heads for the castle, and Jean travels on alone, but is captured by the king's men, who were ordered to bring the fairest wenches to the king's court.

Lord Ravenhurst tells a friend that Giacomo is actually an assassin whom he hired to kill Brockhurst, Finsdale, and Pertwee, to prevent the alliance. Gwendolyn decides to kill Griselda for lying to her, until Griselda promises Giacomo as her prophesied lover. Hawkins, unaware of both these things, enters the castle and tries to make contact with a rebel confederate. However, Ravenhurst unwittingly appears at his whistle signal, so Hawkins allies himself with him instead. Prior to his arrival, Fergus the Hostler, the true confederate, met up with Jean and hid the baby in a basket. Jean sneaks into the palace and steals a key to a secret passage from King Roderick's chambers.

Hawkins is put under a hypnotic spell by Griselda, and in that state woos the princess, receives his orders to kill the three lords from Ravenhurst, and gets the key from Jean, but loses it back to the king. Hawkins forgets all this once the spell is gone. Fergus gives him the basket with the baby, but before he can get it to safety, Hawkins is called before the king. He distracts the king and crowd from noticing the basket with a well-received performance; Jean rescues the basket. Griselda, meanwhile, poisons the three lords' cups to prevent the alliance. Ravenhurst believes Hawkins killed them.

Griswold arrives, but Gwendolyn declares her love for "Giacomo", and Hawkins is arrested and jailed. Ravenhurst learns that Giacomo never arrived and concludes that Hawkins, having sabotaged the alliance, must be the Black Fox. He convinces Roderick to rush Hawkins through the trials to become a knight so he can duel Griswold, ostensibly so Griswold can kill the jester but really so the Black Fox would eliminate Griswold.

Jean steals back the key. Fergus sends it by pigeon to the real Black Fox, but is caught and tortured to death by Ravenhurst's men. At the tournament, Griselda poisons one of the ceremonial drinks and tells Hawkins which. One of Griswold's men overhears and warns Griswold, and he and Hawkins both struggle to remember which of the glasses is poisoned (the famous "Vessel with the Pestle" routine) and end up not drinking the toast. Through sheer luck, Hawkins defeats Griswold in the duel, but spares his life and sends him away.

Ravenhurst finds the baby and exposes Hawkins as a traitor. However, the real Black Fox sends the midgets through the secret passage, and they rescue Hawkins, Jean, and the baby. Jean clubs the door guard and lets the Black Fox's army into the castle. Threatened by Gwendolyn, Griselda hypnotizes Hawkins to become a master swordsman. He duels Ravenhurst, though the spell is accidentally switched on and off several times. In the end, Hawkins and Jean launch Ravenhurst from a catapult into the sea.

Griswold returns with his army ready to kill the rebels, but Hawkins shows him the infant's purple pimpernel birthmark. Griswold kneels to the baby, as does everyone else, including Roderick. Hawkins leads everybody in song as the film ends.

Cast 
(as listed in order of appearance in opening credits)
 Danny Kaye as Hubert Hawkins, a minstrel who steals Giacomo the Jester's identity
 Glynis Johns as Maid Jean, a rebel captain and Hawkins' love interest
 Basil Rathbone as Lord Ravenhurst, the King's closest adviser
 Angela Lansbury as Gwendolyn, Princess of England
 Cecil Parker as Roderick, faux King of England and father of Gwendolyn
 Mildred Natwick as Griselda, a witch and adviser to Gwendolyn
 Robert Middleton as Sir Griswold of MacElwain, Gwendolyn's betrothed
 Michael Pate as Sir Locksley, Ravenhurst's lackey and ally
 Herbert Rudley as the Captain of the Guard, one of Ravenhurst's lackeys
 Noel Drayton as Fergus the Hostler, a spy of the Black Fox in Roderick's castle
 John Carradine as Giacomo, an Italian jester and assassin, hired by Ravenhurst
 Edward Ashley as the Black Fox, a rebel leader 
 Alan Napier as Lord Brockhurst, adviser to Roderick
 Lewis Martin as Lord Finsdale, adviser to Roderick
 Patrick Aherne as Lord Pertwee, adviser to Roderick
 Richard Kean as Archbishop
 Hermine's Midgets as Hubert Hawkins' acrobatic troupe
 The American Legion Zouaves (of Richard F. Smith, Post No. 29, Jackson, Michigan) as the Marching Knights

(Rathbone's name appears three times in opening credits (third, sixth and nineteenth); everyone else's only once)

Production 
(as listed in order of appearance in opening credits)
 Hal Pereira―art direction
 Roland Anderson―art direction
 Tom McAdo―editor
 John P. Fulton, (A.S.C.)―special photography effects
 Irmin Roberts, (A.S.C.)―special photography effects
 Farciot Edouart, (A.S.C.)―process photography
 Sam Comer―set decoration
 Arthur Krams―set decoration
 Edith Head―costumes
 Yvonne Wood―costumes
 John Coonan―assistant director
 D.R.O. Hatswell―technical advisor
 Wally Westmore―makeup supervision
 Harry Lindgren―sound recording
 John Cope―sound recording
 Victor Schoen―music scoring and conducting
 Hal C. Kern―assistant to producers
 James Starbuck―choreographer
 Sylvia Fine―lyrics
 Sammy Cahn―music
 Norman Panama―co-writer, co-producer and co-director
 Melvin Frank―co-writer, co-producer and co-director

Musical score

Hollywood arranger and composer Vic Schoen was asked to provide the musical score for the film. Film composer Elmer Bernstein was hired as the assistant musical director to Schoen. The Court Jester was an enormous challenge for Schoen at the time because it was his first feature film. He was not formally trained on the mechanisms of how music was synchronized to film – he learned on the job. The film  required 100 minutes of music for Schoen to compose and arrange. Some pieces in the film (also known as "cues") were very long, and took many hours for Schoen to finesse. One piece that Schoen was most proud of in his career was the chase music toward the end of the movie when Danny Kaye's character engages in a sword fight. Schoen wrote a mini piano concerto for this scene.

A pleasant surprise happened during the recording session of The Court Jester. The red "recording in progress" light was illuminated to ensure no interruptions, so Schoen started to conduct a cue but noticed that the entire orchestra had turned to look at Igor Stravinsky, who had just walked into the studio. Schoen said, "The entire room was astonished to see this short little man with a big chest walk in and listen to our session. I later talked with him after we were done recording. We went and got a cup of coffee together. After listening to my music Stravinsky told me 'You have broken all the rules'. At the time I didn't understand his comment because I had been self-taught. It took me years to figure out what he had meant."

The film's opening song, "Life Could Not Better Be" breaks the fourth wall by having Kaye make direct references to the cast and crew, at one point also joking about which of the credited songwriters actually wrote the songs. Although not an uncommon trope in musical film comedies of the era (such as Bob Hope and Bing Crosby's "Road" films (several of which were also written by Panama & Frank)), in the context of the film these references also hark back to medieval theatrical performances that often began with an actor explaining the plot and how the play came to be made.

Audio version
In September 1955, Kaye recorded a nine-minute-long, condensed version of The Court Jester for 1956 release by Decca Records on the two-part single K 166. The simplified version of the storyline features excerpts from several songs from the film, but eliminates the character of Hubert; in the 45 single version, The Fox impersonates Giacomo throughout. Lord Ravenhurst is replaced by an unnamed evil king, and Jean is also dropped from the tale. Songs featured (often no more than a few lines): "Outfox the Fox", "I'll Take You Dreaming", "My Heart Knows a Lovely Song", and the finale version of "Life Could Not Better Be."

Reception

Critical reception 

Made for a cost of $4 million (equivalent to $ in ) in the fall of 1955, The Court Jester was the most expensive comedy film produced up to that time. The motion picture bombed at the box office upon its release, bringing in only $2.2 million in receipts the following winter and spring of 1956 (equivalent to $ in ). However, since then it has become a classic and a television matinee favorite. The site's critical consensus reads, "A witty spoof of medieval swashbuckler movies, The Court Jester showcases Danny Kaye at his nimble, tongue-twisting best." Author and film critic Leonard Maltin awarded the film four out of a possible four stars, calling it "one of the best comedies ever made".

David Koenig reflects on Danny Kaye's legacy and The Court Jester, "His legacy has dimmed with the passage of time. His greatest works… endure today only as memories in the minds of aging members of his audiences… much of his TV work has not aged particularly well. Whimsy was of another time". However, Koenig sees Kaye's film work in a different light, "History has smiled on individual pictures—in particular the holiday staple of White Christmas and The Court Jester… the medieval romp has steadily gained a reputation as one of the greatest comedies of  all time."

Awards and honors
In 1957, Danny Kaye received a Golden Globe nomination for Best Motion Picture Actor – Comedy/Musical, and in 2000, the American Film Institute placed the film on its 100 Years...100 Laughs list, where it was ranked #98. In 2004, the United States National Film Registry elected to preserve The Court Jester for being "culturally, historically, or aesthetically significant."

See also
List of American films of 1956
List of American films of 1955

References

External links
 
 
 
 
 The Court Jester essay by Daniel Eagan in America's Film Legacy: The Authoritative Guide to the Landmark Movies in the National Film Registry, A&C Black, 2010 , pages 510-511 

1955 films
1950s English-language films
1956 musical comedy films
1956 films
1950s parody films
1950s satirical films
American adventure comedy films
American musical comedy films
American parody films
American satirical films
Films directed by Melvin Frank
Films directed by Norman Panama
Films scored by Walter Scharf
Films set in castles
Films set in the Middle Ages
Films set in England
Paramount Pictures films
United States National Film Registry films
Films about hypnosis
1955 comedy films
1950s American films